Cartavio (variant: Santa María de Cartavio) is one of seven parishes (administrative divisions) in the Coaña municipality, within the province and autonomous community of Asturias, in northern Spain.

The population is 602 (INE 2007).

References 

Parishes in Coaña